Jeffrey J. Clarke (born July 1961 in Ithaca, New York) is the current Executive Chairman at Florists' Transworld Delivery (FTD LLC).

Biography

Education
Clarke first attended SUNY Geneseo for undergraduate studies and then earned a master's degree in business administration from Northeastern University in 1985.

Career
Clarke was hired by Digital Equipment Corporation in 1985, and came to Compaq when it purchased DEC in 1998. Compaq appointed him as chief financial officer in March 2001. He was executive vice president of global operations for HP.

Clarke was named chief operating officer for CA (formerly Computer Associates) in April 2004.

Clarke was promoted to chief executive officer and president of Cendant's travel distribution services in April 2006. Clarke next served as the Chairman of Travelport, Inc., a private, travel technology firm, where he served as CEO from 2006 to 2011, after leading its sale from Cendant Corporation to the Blackstone Group for US$4.3 billion in 2006.

As Travelport CEO, he reorganized the company around three brands, engineered the acquisition of Worldspan and coordinated the sale of Orbitz Worldwide in an initial public offering on July 20, 2007.

On March 12, 2014, he was named CEO and member of the Board of Directors of Kodak. While CEO at Kodak, Clarke partnered with film directors and Quentin Tarantino, Martin Scorsese and J.J. Abrams to spearhead an effort protecting the use of celluloid film in the Motion Picture Industry. Clarke announced his departure from Kodak on February 20, 2019.

Clarke was announced on November 13, 2017, as having joined the Docker board of directors.

Clarke was announced on August 23, 2019, as having joined FTD LLC as the new Executive Chairman.

Boards and honors

Clarke was formerly a member of the Red Hat board of directors, Compuware Corporation, an enterprise software company, Autodesk, a multinational software corporation, and Orbitz Worldwide, where he served as chairman of the board.

Clarke has also served on the Geneseo Foundation Board of Directors, where he delivered the address for the college's 145th undergraduate commencement. Clarke is a member of the Board of Trustees of Northeastern University.

References

External links
 Kodak 
 Jeff Clarke Kodak Bio 
 Travelport
 Jeff Clarke Travelport Bio
 The Blackstone Group
 Compuware

American technology chief executives
American transportation businesspeople
1961 births
Living people
Northeastern University alumni
People from Ithaca, New York
American chief operating officers
American chief financial officers
Kodak people